Sarah Bowie is an Irish illustrator, author and cartoonist.

Life and career
Bowie lives in Dublin where she was a founder member of The Comics Lab. Although she got a degree in marketing and languages in 1999, she has gone on to become a visual artist. Her art has appeared in a range of books, comics and magazines including cover illustrations such as an issue of the Dublin Inquirer. She has supported comics creators in producing their published work. She published her first picture book in 2016. Bowie worked as a Visual Analyst for a design thinking company. She organised the first indie Irish-French Comics Festival. Bowie completed a three-month residency in Angouleme. She has published several children's books. Bowie also does workshops with children.

Bibliography 

 A Clock or a Crown (Little Island –  2015)
 BUZZ 2 (Oonagh Young Gallery –  2015) 
 Ruaille Buaille (Coimici Gael –  2015)
 Let's See Ireland (O'Brien Press – 2016)
 We're Going to the Zoo! (O'Brien Press – 2018)

References 

Living people
Year of birth missing (living people)
21st-century Irish women writers
21st-century Irish women artists
Artists from Dublin (city)
Writers from Dublin (city)